"Connected" is a song by British hip hop/electronic music group Stereo MC's. It is the title track of their third studio album, and was released in September 1992 as the album's lead single. The song samples "Let Me (Let Me Be Your Lover)" by Jimmy "Bo" Horne and peaked at number 18 on the UK Singles Chart. Internationally, "Connected" peaked within the top 10 of the charts in Austria, Sweden and Switzerland, and peaked within the top 20 of the charts in Belgium, Finland and the United States. Its music video was directed by Matthew Amos. The song later appeared in the 1995 movie Hackers, and it was the theme to the Rob Lowe programme Dr. Vegas (2004).

Production and lyrics
The song uses a bassline sampled from Jimmy "Bo" Horne's song "Let Me (Let Me Be Your Lover)". QC and Post Production Duplicates by Marty Munsch (CPI). Group member Nick Hallam told Billboard about the song's lyrics, "The song [...] is about human beings and the lack of connection there is between anything today. It's about the way everyone tries to categorize everything. The way every race is trying to separate from each other."

Chart performance
"Connected" was a major hit on the charts in several countries, and is the group's most successful song. In Europe, it entered the top 10 in Austria (5), Sweden (8) and Switzerland (6), and the top 20 in Belgium (19), Finland (14) and the United Kingdom. In the latter, the single peaked at number 18 in its second week at the UK Singles Chart on 27 September 1992. It stayed at that position for two weeks. Additionally, "Connected" peaked within the top 30 in France (27), and the top 60 in the Netherlands (54), while on the Eurochart Hot 100, it was a top 40 hit, reaching number 36 in January 1993. On the European Dance Radio Chart, it was even more successful, peaking at number four ten months later.

Outside Europe, the song made it to number seven on the Canadian RPM Dance/Urban chart, while peaking at number 32 on the RPM Top Singles chart and number seven on the RPM Adult Contemporary chart. In the US, "Connected" reached number 15 on the Cash Box Top 100, while peaking at number 20 on the Billboard Hot 100. It also charted on the Billboard Hot Dance Club Play chart (26), the Billboard Modern Rock Tracks chart (4), the Billboard Rhythmic Top 40 chart (38), and the Billboard Top 40 Mainstream chart (11). In Australia and News Zealand, the song peaked at number 24 and 47, respectively.

Critical reception
Larry Flick from Billboard described the song as "an instantly insinuating hiphop/funk workout. A shuffling groove supports cool horns and a contagious chorus that is phattened by nifty femme vocal chants. In its current form, "Connected" is a sturdy precursor to an evening or a fine way to wind down into daylight." In January 1993, Flick remarked that this "mid-tempo retro-funk affair" has been making inroads with urban-minded DJs for several weeks now. Per Reinholdt Nielsen from Danish Gaffa praised the song as "a clever lesson in funk. The number is extremely simple. A great sound sampled from half a beat KC and the Sunshine Band pulls back, while Owen If whips the drums forward. Three chorus girls, rapper Rob Birch and various samples decorate the landscape, but it is the sucks of the "two rhythm groups" that lock "Connected" into the memory and body of the defenseless listener." Andrew Smith from Melody Maker complimented its "forbidding funk", "which marries a lazy, Mondays-style swagger with Curtis Mayfield-like melancholy". 

The magazine also noted that the song has "more than a hint of an Andrew Weatherall-esque shuffle", and concluded, "Once you've heard the chorus a couple of times, I guarantee you will be humming it until Christmas 1993." A reviewer from Music & Media stated that it's a "sure hit", noting further that the new female vocalists are "shining over expressive rich grooves." Alan Jones from Music Week said in his review of the album, that the introductory single, "with its pulsing bass, and slick femme harmonies is fairly typical of the fare here, with what raps there are well-couched and friendly." Jim Carroll from NME called it a "chock-a-block wit jazzy flutes, chugging organs and Rob B's fine growling rap". Jonathan Bernstein from Spin remarked the song's "maximum uplift", writing, "Imagine a less lush Massive Attack and you're almost there." Victor Haseman from The Stanford Daily found that the Stereo MC's "have made stitching their patchwork quilt of Euro-electro pop, hip-hop and house their top priority, tirelessly pushing it in new directions".

Impact and legacy
Paste ranked "Connected" number eight in their list of "25 Awesome One-Hit Wonders of the 1990s" in 2011. In 2014, the track was ranked number 322 in the German magazine Musikexpress list of the "700 Best Songs of All-Time". The Daily Telegraph ranked it number 34 in their "Top 50 Dance Songs" list in 2015. American entertainment company BuzzFeed ranked "Connected" number 82 in their list of "The 101 Greatest Dance Songs of the '90s" in 2017. ThoughtCo ranked it number 65 in their list of "The Best 100 Songs from the 1990s" list in 2018. An editor, Bill Lamb, remarked that the song "is propelled by a catchy but downbeat atmospheric brand of hip-hop."

Use in other media
The song appears in the movie Saving Silverman as well as Hackers. It has also been used in commercials promoting the USA Network's program Burn Notice, and by The Carphone Warehouse.

"Connected" was used in the reveal trailer of the upcoming video game Crime Boss: Rockay City.

Music video
The accompanying music video for "Connected" was directed by Matthew Amos.

Track listings

 CD maxi – Germany, United Kingdom
"Connected" (edit) – 4:05
"Connected" (full length) – 5:16
"Disconnected" – 6:06
"Fever" – 3:15

 7" single
"Connected" (edit) – 3:59
"Fever" – 3:15

 12" maxi – Germany, United Kingdom
"Connected" (full length) – 5:12
"Connected" (reprise) – 1:43
"Disconnected" – 6:04
"Fever" – 3:15

 12" maxi – Promo – France
"Connected" (Future Sound of London mix) – 6:19
"Disconnected" – 6:04

 US promo cassette
Side A
"Connected" (edit)
Side B
"Step It Up"
"Don't Let Up"
"Ground Level"

Charts

References

1992 songs
1992 singles
Island Records singles
Stereo MCs songs
Funk songs